Uładzimir Ivanavič Hančaryk or Vladimir Ivanovich Goncharik (born 29 April 1940 in Lahojsk, Soviet Union), is a Belarusian politician.

He was the candidate from united opposition forces that stood against Alexander Lukashenko in the 2001 elections for the office of President of Belarus. As he was the candidate from united opposition, he was supported by a fellow opposition candidate Siamion Domash, who withdrew his candidacy and urged his supporters to vote for Hančaryk. Hančaryk failed to become the president, when the electoral committee announced official results, according to which he lost the vote to Lukashenko by a 60 percent margin. The elections were considered fraudulent by independent observers.

Before the elections, he was a chairman of the official Federation of Trade Unions of Belarus.

References

Sources
2001 Belarusian election profile

1940 births
Living people
People from Lahoysk District
Belarusian politicians
Belarusian trade unionists
Candidates for President of Belarus